The China Medal (China-Denkmünze), was a medal of the German Empire.  It was established on 10 May 1901 by Kaiser Wilhelm II, in his capacity as King of Prussia and German Kaiser.  There were two versions of the medal one in bronze and a variant in steel.  The bronze medal was a reward for service by German troops and civilians during the Boxer Rebellion.  The steel medal was awarded to people contributing to the war effort at home and the sailors of the merchant fleet transporting the soldiers to China.

The initial design came from Wilhelm II himself and was executed by professor Walter Schott.  The medals were produced by the company Mayer & Wilhelm in Stuttgart.

There were also 14 medal clips awarded for involvement in battles.

References 

Orders, decorations, and medals of the German Empire
Boxer Rebellion campaign medals
1901 establishments in Germany
Awards established in 1901
German campaign medals